Kielmeyera is a plant genus in the family Calophyllaceae. It is endemic to South America, with a large occurrence in the Brazilian cerrados.

Species include:
Kielmeyera coriacea
Kielmeyera microphylla
Kielmeyera neglecta
Kielmeyera neriifolia
Kielmeyera peruviana
Kielmeyera reticulata
Kielmeyera rubriflora
Kielmeyera speciosa
Kielmeyera variabilis

References

 
Malpighiales genera
Flora of South America
Flora of the Cerrado
Taxa named by Carl Friedrich Philipp von Martius